The VinFast VF e34 is an electric compact crossover SUV manufactured and marketed by VinFast of Vingroup from 2021.

Overview

In the second half of January 2021, VinFast officially introduced the range of its first electric cars, consisting of three crossovers of different sizes. The smallest of them was the subcompact model called VF e34, which maintains its characteristic proportions with a narrow and high body, as well as a rounded silhouette.

The front section is adorned with two-level headlamps consisting of higher LED daytime running LEDs and lower lenses with road lights. In the passenger compartment, which is kept in a uniformly dark colour, the central console is dominated by a vertical, touchscreen display for controlling the multimedia system. Contrary to the previous LUX A2.0 and LUX SA2.0 models, the vehicle was based on an in-house developed platform.

First, the VF e34 will go on sale in the domestic Vietnamese market, where the manufacturer plans to start collecting orders since 24 March 2021, making deliveries from November of the same year. As in the case of the larger VF8 and VF9 models, 

The car is priced at 690 million VND (30,000 USD) with a 10 years warranty, although VinFast is offering a 590 million VND (25,600 USD) price and a free 12-month battery subscription for the e34 as an incentive for pre-orders before 30 June 2021. The first batch of VF e34 EVs in Vietnam will come available with a new battery rental package. As part of the package, VinFast has reduced the minimum distance of 1,400 km/month to 500 km/month, VinFast will replace the lithium-ion battery pack in the VF e34 if the recharge capacity drops below 70 per cent.

It also comes with advanced features such as remote software update, vehicle issue diagnosis and warning, remote customer support, itinerary planning, and a charging station location guide.

According to Vinfast, as of 2021, six months since the launch of the VF e34 electric car model in Vietnam, 25,000 customers have placed orders for the car. The first 25,000 VinFast EV customers will get free battery rental for the first 12 months.

In December 2021, the first batch of 100 Vinfast VF e34 were delivered to Vietnamese customers, the VF e34 also marks VinFast’s first battery electric vehicle model and the first ever electric vehicle to be manufactured and sold in Vietnam. The start of production is also the first step in VinFast bringing its EVs to the US market. 

In 2022 November 08th, VF e34 had rated of 4 stars from ASEAN NCAP.

References

External link 
 
 VinFast

Cars introduced in 2021
Crossover sport utility vehicles
Compact sport utility vehicles
Production electric cars
VF e34
Battery electric vehicles
Compact cars